The January 2020 European Masters was a professional ranking snooker tournament that took place from 22 to 26 January 2020 in Dornbirn, Austria. Organised by the World Professional Billiards and Snooker Association (WPBSA), it was the ninth ranking event of the 2019–20 season, following the 2019 UK Championship, and preceding the 2020 German Masters. It was the twenty-first edition of the European Masters first held in 1989. The event was sponsored by betting company BetVictor.

Qualifying took place from 17 to 19 December 2019 in Barnsley, England. Jimmy Robertson was the defending champion after defeating Joe Perry 9–6 in the 2018 final, but he lost 3–5 to Martin O'Donnell in the first qualifying round. Neil Robertson won the seventeenth ranking title of his career with a 9–0 whitewash win over Zhou Yuelong in the final. It was only the second whitewash in a two-session ranking event final, the first since the 1989 Grand Prix. A total of 27 century breaks were made during the tournament, with Thailand's Thepchaiya  making the highest, a 146 in the first round.

Tournament format
The January 2020 European Masters was a professional snooker tournament held at the Messe Dornbirn in Dornbirn, Austria, between 22 and 26 January 2020. This was the twenty-first edition of the European Masters tournament, the first having been held in 1989 as the 1989 European Open. It was the ninth ranking event of the 2019–20 snooker season following the 2019 UK Championship and preceding the 2020 German Masters. It was played as the best-of-nine frames until the semi-finals, which were best-of-eleven frames, followed by a best-of-seventeen frames final. The event featured thirty-two participants from the World Snooker Tour with two qualifying rounds which took place from 17 to 19 December 2019 in Barnsley, England. The World Professional Billiards and Snooker Association and World Snooker organised the European Masters, and it was the first snooker ranking event to be held in Austria.

Prize fund
The event featured a total prize fund of £407,000 with the winner receiving £80,000. The event was the first of the "European Series", all sponsored by betting company BetVictor also including the German Masters, Snooker Shoot Out and Gibraltar Open. The player who accumulates the highest amount of prize money over the four events receives a bonus of £150,000. The breakdown of prize money for the event is shown below:

 Winner: £80,000
 Runner-up: £35,000
 Semi-final: £17,500
 Quarter-final: £11,000
 Last 16: £6,000
 Last 32: £4,000
 Last 64: £3,000
 Highest break: £5,000
 Total: £407,000

Summary

Qualifying
The tournament began with a two-round qualification process held in the Barnsley Metrodome, Barnsley, England between 17 and 19 December 2019. All matches were held as the best-of-nine frames. The defending champion was Jimmy Robertson, who won his first ranking event in the 2018 final, where he defeated Joe Perry in the final 9–6. Both Robertson and Perry, however, lost in the opening qualifying round for the 2020 event to Martin O'Donnell and Tian Pengfei respectively. Reigning world champion Judd Trump was also defeated in the first round of qualifying, losing 3–5 to Ian Burns. Neil Robertson arrived late for his qualifying match against Nigel Bond but still won 5–2. World number thirteen David Gilbert lost 2–5 to Jordan Brown. The second qualifying round also featured top ranked players failing to progress. World number seven Mark Allen was whitewashed by Lu Ning 0–5.

Knockout stages

The main stages of the competition were played from 22 to 26 January 2020. All matches until the semi-finals were played as best-of-nine frames, with no . The first round saw Riga Masters champion Yan Bingtao withdraw from the competition because of back pain. Thepchaiya  defeated Robbie Williams in his first round match, making the tournament's highest  of 146 in the sixth frame. World number three Mark Williams lost on a deciding frame to Zhou Yeulong 4–5. Higgins commented, "It's a tough one to take. I should have won 5–2", having been 4–2 ahead. Barry Hawkins defeated former world champion Mark Selby 5–4, in a match that contained nine breaks of over fifty. The UK Championship winner Ding Junhui lost 5–2 to Scott Donaldson.

The quarter-finals saw 2020 Masters finalist Ali Carter defeat Donaldson 5–1, Hawkins lose to Zhou Yuelong 2–5, Gary Wilson defeat Marco Fu 5–3 and Neil Robertson defeat  5–1, with Robertson scoring three century breaks. The first semi-final was played between Carter and Robertson. Robertson won the opening frame then Carter leveled the score at 1–1. Robertson won the next five frames to win 6–1. After the match, Robertson commented that "[Carter's] mindset didn't seem to be there from the outset, maybe it was a hangover from the Masters". The second semi-final was held between Zhou and Wilson. Wilson led early in the match, but there was never more than two frames between the players. In a decider, Zhou won the frame to reach his first ranking event final, 6–5.

The final was played on 26 January 2020 between Robertson and Zhou, as a best-of-17 frames match over two . The match was the first ranking event final for Zhou, and the first time since the 2017 Scottish Open it was contested by two players not from the United Kingdom. In the first session, Robertson won all eight frames, scoring a century break in both the fourth and eighth frames. When the match resumed, Zhou went  on the final , allowing Robertson to win frame nine and complete a 9–0 victory. The win was only the second whitewash in a two-session ranking event final, the first since Steve Davis beat Dean Reynolds 10–0 in the 1989 Grand Prix final. By winning this event, Robertson had won one every season since 2006.

Main draw
Below is the draw from the main stage (last 32) onwards. Seeded players have their seedings in brackets. Players highlighted in bold denote match winners.

Final

Qualifying
Two rounds of qualifying matches were held between 17 and 19 December 2019 at the Barnsley Metrodome in Barnsley, England. All matches were the best-of-nine frames.

Round 1

Round 2

Century breaks

Main stage centuries
A total of 27 century breaks were made during the competition. The highest was a 146 made by Thepchaiya  in frame six of his first round match against Robbie Williams.

 146, 124  Thepchaiya Un-Nooh
 136  Mark Selby
 131  Ding Junhui
 130  Michael Holt
 128, 115, 110, 109, 107, 104, 100  Neil Robertson
 121  Xiao Guodong
 113, 113, 100  Zhou Yuelong
 109  Scott Donaldson
 106, 105, 105, 104, 102  Gary Wilson
 104  Graeme Dott
 102, 100  Barry Hawkins
 102  Liang Wenbo
 102  Marco Fu

Qualifying stage centuries 
A total of 67 century breaks were made during the qualifying stages of the event. The highest of these was a 142 made by Michael Georgiou, made in frame four of his first round match against Luca Brecel.

 142  Michael Georgiou
 140  Jordan Brown
 137, 116, 105, 102, 102  Yan Bingtao
 135, 108, 105  Scott Donaldson
 135  Barry Hawkins
 135  David Grace
 134, 132, 121, 102  Liang Wenbo
 134  Alfie Burden
 134  Chang Bingyu
 131, 129  Luo Honghao
 130, 116  Zhou Yuelong
 128, 100  Lyu Haotian
 127, 126, 105  Jak Jones
 125  Martin Gould
 124, 113  Luca Brecel
 123, 100  Jack Lisowski
 120, 112  Xiao Guodong
 120  Mitchell Mann
 119  Michael White
 119  Stuart Bingham
 117, 102  Joe Perry
 115, 103, 100  Neil Robertson
 115  Jimmy Robertson
 114, 114  Ryan Day
 113, 100  Robbie Williams
 113  Tom Ford
 112  Gary Wilson
 112  Thepchaiya Un-Nooh
 109, 107  Fergal O'Brien
 109  Tian Pengfei
 108  Lukas Kleckers
 106  Craig Steadman
 106  Dominic Dale
 105, 104, 102  Ding Junhui
 104, 101  Daniel Wells
 104  Mark King
 102  David Lilley
 102  Mei Xiwen
 101  Li Hang
 100  Chen Zifan
 100  Stephen Maguire

References

European Masters
European Masters
Dornbirn
2020
European Masters
Snooker in Austria
European Masters